The 2018–19 LIU Brooklyn Blackbirds men's basketball team represented LIU Brooklyn during the 2018–19 NCAA Division I men's basketball season. The Blackbirds were led by second-year head coach Derek Kellogg, and played their home games at the Steinberg Wellness Center, with two home games at the Barclays Center, as members of the Northeast Conference (NEC). They finished the season 16–16 overall, 9–9 in NEC play to finish in a tie for fifth place. As the No. 6 seed in the NEC tournament, they advanced to the semifinals, where they were defeated by Saint Francis (PA).

The season was the final season for the LIU Brooklyn athletic program as a distinct entity, and also the last for the "Blackbirds" nickname. Long Island University merged its two athletic programs—the Division I LIU Brooklyn Blackbirds and Division II LIU Post Pioneers—into a single Division I athletic program that has since competed as the LIU Sharks. The unified LIU program maintained LIU Brooklyn's NEC membership. The Brooklyn campus will be home to the unified basketball program.

Previous season 
The Blackbirds finished the 2017–18 season at 18–17, 10–8 in NEC play to finish in a tie for fourth place. As the No. 4 seed in the NEC tournament, they defeated St. Francis Brooklyn, Fairleigh Dickinson, and Wagner to become NEC Tournament champions. They earned the NEC's automatic bid to the NCAA tournament where they lost in the First Four to Radford.

Roster

  

   
 
        

 

Source

Schedule and results

|-
!colspan=9 style=| Non-conference regular season

|-
!colspan=9 style=| Northeast Conference regular season    

|-
!colspan=9 style=| NEC tournament

Schedule source:

References

LIU Brooklyn Blackbirds men's basketball seasons
LIU Brooklyn
LIU Brooklyn
LIU Brooklyn